Ian Kajubu Rukunya (born 10 June 1988) is a Ugandan squash player. He has represented Uganda at the Commonwealth Games in 2010, 2014 and 2018.

References

1988 births
Living people
Ugandan male squash players
Squash players at the 2010 Commonwealth Games
Squash players at the 2014 Commonwealth Games
Squash players at the 2018 Commonwealth Games
Commonwealth Games competitors for Uganda